In the mathematical field of infinite group theory, the Nottingham group is the group J(Fp) or  N(Fp) consisting of formal power series t + a2t2+...
with coefficients in Fp. The group multiplication is given by formal composition also called substitution. That is, if

and if  is another element, then 
. 
The group multiplication is not abelian. The group was studied by number theorists as the group of wild automorphisms of the local field Fp((t)) and by group theorists including D.  and the name "Nottingham group" refers to his former domicile.

This group is a finitely generated pro-p-group, of finite width. For every finite group of order a power of p there is a closed subgroup of the Nottingham group isomorphic to that finite group.

References

Group theory
History of Nottingham
University of Nottingham